Rosas  or Las Rosas may refer to:

 Rosas (surname), a Spanish surname, including a list of people with the name
 Rosas (Madrid), a ward in San Blas-Canillejas district, Madrid, Spain
 Rosas, Cauca, a town and municipality in Colombia
 , a dance company founded by Anne Teresa De Keersmaeker in 1983
 "Rosas" (song), by La Oreja de Van Gogh, 2003
 "Rosas", a song by Ana Carolina from Dois Quartos, 2006
 "Rosas" (Nica del Rosario song), a song by Nica del Rosario that served as an anthem for Leni Robredo's 2022 presidential campaign
 Las Rosas (Madrid Metro), a metro station in San Blas, Madrid, Spain
 Las Rosas, Chiapas, a city in Mexico
 Las Rosas, Santa Fe, a city in Argentina

See also
 
 Rosa (disambiguation)
 Roses, Girona (Spanish: Rosas), a town in Catalonia, Spain
 Roses (disambiguation)